American Samoa participated in the 2010 Summer Youth Olympics.

The American Samoan squad consisted of 4 athletes competing in 4 sports: aquatics (swimming), sailing, weightlifting and wrestling.

Sailing

Girls

Swimming

Boys

Weightlifting

Boys

Wrestling

Freestyle

References

External links
Competitors List: American Samoa

Nations at the 2010 Summer Youth Olympics
2010 in American Samoan sports
American Samoa at the Youth Olympics